Alik Ismail-Zadeh is a mathematical geophysicist known for his contribution to computational geodynamics and natural hazard studies, pioneering work on data assimilation in geodynamics as well as for outstanding service to the Earth and space science community. He is Senior Research Fellow (in the rank of Research Professor) at the Karlsruhe Institute of Technology in Germany.

Biography and academic career
Born in Baku, Azerbaijan, Ismail-Zadeh attended the Bulbul specialized secondary music school of the Baku Academy of Music and Baku High School #134 (specialized in mathematics) between 1967 and 1978. He graduated from the Baku State University and the Lomonosov Moscow State University in 1983 before being awarded Ph.D. degree in 1990 and D.Sc. (Habilitation) in 1997 from the Russian Academy of Sciences in Moscow, Russia. Ismail-Zadeh has been affiliated to the Azerbaijan National Academy of Sciences, Institute of Geology and Geophysics (1983-1986, 1990-1992). He has been chief scientist, research professor and scientific leader of research group "Computational Geodynamics and Geohazard Modeling" of the Russian Academy of Sciences Institute of Earthquake Prediction Theory and Mathematical Geophysics, Moscow (1992–2022).

He has been a visiting scholar, lecturer and professor at several universities and academic centers, including the University of Cambridge (UK), University of California at Los Angeles, the University of Tokyo (Japan), Institut de Physique du Globe de Paris (France), the University of Uppsala (Sweden), and the Abdus Salam International Centre for Theoretical Physics in Trieste (Italy).

Scientific interests and results achieved
Research interests of Ismail-Zadeh cover geodynamics, seismology, sedimentary geology and tectonics (incl. research for hydrocarbon industry), geohazards, risk analysis, science diplomacy and history. His research methods are also broad covering multi- and interdisciplinary synthesis, theoretical analysis, and numerical experiments. He is a principal author and co-author of over 120 peer-reviewed papers and several books published by the Cambridge University Press, Springer Nature, and others. Scientific results obtained by him and his group are as follows:

Inverse Problems and Data Assimilation
 Introduction of data assimilation in models of geodynamics and applications to mantle (plume) dynamics.;
 Reconstruction of sinking lithosphere in the southeastern Carpathians;
 Reconstruction of the western Pacific and Philippine plate subduction beneath the Japanese islands and implication on the Japan Sea opening;
 Reconstruction of flow and temperature inside volcanic lava flow based on surface observations;
 Restoration of sedimentary basin evolution complicated by salt tectonics: application to Pricaspian basin of the East European platform.

Lithosphere dynamics and seismicity
 Model of the block-and-fault dynamics
 Quantitative models of a fault network interaction in the Tibet-Himalayan region to explain seismicity and slip rates at major regional faults;
 Peculiarities of the Vrancea intermediate-depth seismicity

Seismic and Volcanic Hazard and Risk
 Deterministic and probabilistic seismic hazard assessments for the Vrancea region (Romania), Tibet-Himalaya, and Shillong Plateau (India). Earthquake risk assessment for the Baku city (Azerbaijan);
 Volcanic lava hazard evaluation based on lava flow with debris.

Tectonic Stress
 Understanding of tectonic stress localization and its change in the lithospheric slab in terms of style of the slab subduction;
 Explanation of coexisting shortening - extension and seismic activity in the Central Apennines by the buoyancy of the lithosphere;
 Tectonic stress localization in the Vrancea earthquake-prone body beneath the south-eastern Carpathians.

Sedimentary Basins
 Introduction of eclogitization-induced mantle flow mechanism for sedimentary basin evolution;
 Quantitative models of the evolution of intracratonic sedimentary basins in North America (Illinois, Michigan and Williston basins), East European (Dnieper-Donets, Moscow, Pre-Ural, Timan-Pechora basins), and Siberian (Tunguska and Viluy basins) platforms;
 Models of geothermal evolution of the Astrakhan Arch of the Pricaspian Basin.

Numerical methods for geodynamics
 New numerical methods and algorithms of an enhanced accuracy to study problems of Earth's dynamics;
 Numerical methodology for data assimilation in geodynamics (backward advection, variational/adjoint, and quasi-reversibility methods).

Gravitational and Thermal Instability
 Theoretical results in problems of Rayleigh-Taylor and Rayleigh-Bernard instabilities of the (geo) structures including analysis of Newtonian, Maxwell, non-Newtonian power law, and perfectly plastic rheologies;
 Applications to salt diapirism: Models of salt structure evolution in the Pricaspain Basin

Science organization, history and diplomacy

Activities in national, regional, international, and intergovernmental organizations

Alik Ismail-Zadeh is active in promoting science research, science excellency and science for society worldwide. From 2018 to 2021, Ismail-Zadeh served as (inaugural) secretary-general of the International Science Council (ISC), the largest international non-governmental science organization designed to defend the inherent value of science and to provide a powerful and credible voice for science. Also, he was (inaugural) chair of the ISC Awards Programme Committee, and currently he is a senior adviser to the ISC governing board (2021–2024).

Ismail-Zadeh was elected secretary-general of the International Union of Geodesy and Geophysics (IUGG) in 2007, and served the union for 12 years in this capacity (until 2019). Also, he served the union as chair of the IUGG Commission on Geophysical Risk and Sustainability (2003–2007). He is currently chair of the IUGG Commission on Mathematical Geophysics (2019–2023). Also, he is a member of the scientific council of the UNESCO East African Institute for Fundamental Research (EAIFR), Kigali, Rwanda, since 2018.

He was a founding member and the (inaugural) governing board member of the European Association for the Promotion of Science and Technology (EuroScience); (inaugural) president of the Natural Hazards Section of the American Geophysical Union (AGU); chair of the Committee on Sergei Soloviev Medal on Natural Hazards of the European Geosciences Union (EGU); chair of the steering committee of GeoUnions grouped under the International Science Council; and council member of the UNESCO International Geoscience Program. He served the Comprehensive Nuclear-Test-Ban Treaty Organization [CTBTO], the Group on Earth Observations [GEO], the United Nations Office for Disaster Risk Reduction [UNDRR] and the United Nations International Year of Planet Earth [IYPE; 2007-2009] in various capacities.

Alik Ismail-Zadeh has been editor or member of several editorial/advisory boards, including Surveys in Geophysics, Springer Nature; Special Publications of Geodesy and Geophysics series, Cambridge University Press; Computational Seismology and Geodynamics, American Geophysical Union

Awards and honours
 Fellow, International Science Council (2022)
  Distinguished Lecturer of the College of Fellows, American Geophysical Union (2021-2023)
 Ambassador Award, American Geophysical Union (2019)
 Fellow, American Geophysical Union (2019)
 Fellow, International Union of Geodesy and Geophysics (2019)
 Member, Academia Europaea (2017)
 Honorary Fellow, Royal Astronomical Society (2013)
 Axford Distinguished Lecture Award, Asia Oceania Geosciences Society  (2012)
 International Award, AGU (2009)
 Fellowship Award, Alexander von Humboldt Foundation (2001)
 Research Award to Earlier Career Scientist, Russian President Boris Yeltsin (1999)
 Prize to Young Scientist, Academia Europaea (1995)

References

1961 births
Living people
Members of Academia Europaea
20th-century Azerbaijani mathematicians
Scientists from Baku
Baku State University alumni
Moscow State University alumni
Russian Academy of Sciences
Geodynamics
Academic staff of the Karlsruhe Institute of Technology
Royal Astronomical Society
Fellows of the American Geophysical Union
21st-century Azerbaijani mathematicians